Memory of the Garden at Etten (Ladies of Arles) is an oil painting by Vincent van Gogh. It was executed in Arles around November 1888 and is in the collection of the Hermitage Museum. It was intended as decoration for his bedroom at the Yellow House.

Background 
The "Garden at Etten" refers to the parsonage garden at Etten (now Etten-Leur) which Vincent's father, pastor Theodorus van Gogh, visited in 1875. Vincent spent periods of time there, notably from Easter to Christmas 1881 when he returned to join his brother Theo, an art dealer, determined to become an artist. This period at Etten represents the beginning proper of Vincent's ten-year career as an artist. He had drawn since boyhood, and the previous year had enrolled in a beginners' class in Brussels where he met the painter Anthon van Rappard, but he now began to draw in earnest. He rapidly developed an accomplished technique in landscape drawing but remained rather more uncertain in his figure drawing, which he practised assiduously with the aid of Charles Bargue's drawing course. Rappard made a twelve-day visit during this time, and they sketched together in the marshes and heaths round Etten. Vincent also visited his cousin-in-law Anton Mauve in The Hague, a celebrated artist of the time, who had expressed an interest in his drawings and who encouraged him  further. At this time Vincent had not progressed as far as painting, though he did wash some of his drawings with watercolor. At the end of the year he made an extended visit to Mauve, who introduced him to painting. He returned to Etten with the intention of setting up a studio there.

That summer Vincent became infatuated with his recently widowed cousin Kee Vos-Stricker, daughter of the theologian Johannes Stricker, who had been invited to stay over the summer with her eight-year-old son Jan. Vincent had last visited her in Amsterdam some three years before while her husband was still alive  (there is a family photo extant dating from 1872 thought to show Vincent side by side with Kee), but now her new situation stirred his tender feelings and romantic disposition. They took pleasant walks together and within the fortnight Vincent proposed marriage. She famously rebuffed him with a curt "No, at no time, never", abruptly taking her leave for Amsterdam and never dealing with him again. Vincent's obsessive attempts to press his suit eventually became a matter of family scandal, culminating in a bitter quarrel with his father on Christmas Day and his leaving the family home to set up his proposed studio in The Hague instead.

Vincent subsequently painted in Drenthe, Nuenen (his last family home), and Antwerp, before joining Theo in Paris in 1886, Finally he set up a studio in 1888 at the Yellow House in Arles, where he was joined by Paul Gauguin, with the intention of forming an artists' commune.

History 

The painting is plainly influenced by Gauguin's Arlésiennes (Mistral) painted at the same time. In his letters about the painting Vincent makes it clear he was at pains to use his imagination in the way Gauguin was countenancing.

In Gauguin's painting the figure of the older woman is recognisably Madame Ginoux who ran  the Café de la Gare where Vincent had lodged and which he and Gauguin continued to patronise after moving into the nearby Yellow House. Vincent's figures are generally taken to be his mother and sister Willemien. Vincent 's biographer Marc Edo Tralbaut, however, was of the opinion that the younger woman was, consciously or unconsciously, a representation of Kee Vos Stricker. Vincent was somewhat enigmatic on the subject in a letter to his sister:

In a later letter, he says he has spoiled the painting and refers to it as "that thing I did of the garden at Nuenen" (i.e. his later family home and not Etten), leading Hulsker to suggest he really had no particular location in mind. Hulsker is puzzled by the remark that Vincent thought he had spoiled the painting, describing the painting as fascinating and enigmatic, "rich in subdued yet sparkling colours". Both he and Tralbaut are reminded of medieval stained-glass windows.

Gauguin's influence 
 In his catalogue raisonné, Hulsker considers the claim that the radical changes now evident in Vincent's work were a result of Gauguin's influence and the Synthetic Symbolism style of painting, a fusion of Neo-Impressionism, Japonisme, and Pont Aven Symbolism, that he developed with Émile Bernard. In a collection of reminisces Avant et Après published 15 years later, Gauguin himself made the claim:

Hulsker remarks that in reality Vincent was already in his prime as an artist when Gauguin arrived. For a while he was influenced by Gauguin's theory of painting from the imagination and Memory of the Garden at Etten is certainly a conscious effort to paint in this style, but he soon returned to Realism. As for the Sunflower paintings, those had been completed fully two months before Gauguin's arrival.

Provenance 

 Émile Schuffenecker, Clamart [recorded 1908]
 Sergei Shchukin, Moscow, cat 1913, nr 35
 Moscow, Museum of Modern Western Art [acquired 1918], cat 1928, nr 79
 Leningrad, Hermitage [acquired 1948], inv nr 9116, cat 1958, p 291 at 1967, nrs 65-66

Exhibition History 

 1908 Paris (VvG, Galerie E. Druet, 6–18 January, 35 nrs), 30
 1926 Moscow
 1956 Moscow, Leningrad, p II
 1960 Paris, 49

Notes

Letters

Bibliography 
 
 de la Faille, Jacob-Baart. The Works of Vincent van Gogh: His Paintings and Drawings. Amsterdam: Meulenhoff, 1970. 
 Hulsker, Jan. The Complete Van Gogh. Oxford: Phaidon, 1980. 
 Gayford, Martin. The Yellow House: Van Gogh, Gauguin, and Nine Turbulent Weeks in Provence. New York: Mariner Books, 2008. 
 Naifeh, Steven; Smith, Gregory White. Van Gogh: The Life. Profile Books, 2011. 
 Pomerans, Arnold. The Letters of Vincent van Gogh. Penguin Classics, 2003. 
 Tralbaut, Marc Edo 8 x Van Gogh; Vincent van Gogh et les Femmes (Antwerp: Pierre Peré, 1962)
 Tralbaut, Marc Edo. Vincent van Gogh, Macmillan, London 1969,

External links

Paintings by Vincent van Gogh
1888 paintings
Paintings in the collection of the Hermitage Museum
Flower paintings